The holly blue (Celastrina argiolus) is a butterfly that belongs to the lycaenids or blues family and is native to the Palearctic.

The holly blue has pale silver-blue wings spotted with pale ivory dots. Seitz describes it "Male above shining violet blue, only the apical portion of the costal margin being minutely edged with white. The female has both wings broadly bordered with dark, the margin of the hindwing bearing vestiges of ocelli. Underside silver-white, in the disc a row of black dots, some of which are elongate, and before the margin blackish shadowy dots. Egg very flat, whitish. Larva green or brown, marked with yellowish white, bearing catenulate stripes on the back, on segment 7 a gland to attract ants; head brown. On Ivy, Ilex, Evonymus, Rhamnus, Robinia, Genista, Spartium, Astragalus, Rubus, Erica, Pyrus and many other plants; in Europe visited usually by ants of the genus Lasius; in June and the autumn. Pupa mostly fastened to the underside of a leaf, ochreous with brown spots and markings. The butterflies in the spring and again in July, occasionally a third time at the end of August and in September, everywhere common, particularly at the flowers of ivy and brambles." In Europe, the first generation feeds mainly on the holly species Ilex aquifolium but the second generation uses a range of food plants.

The holly blue is the national butterfly of Finland.

Taxonomy
This species was originally described as Papilio argiolus by Carl Linnaeus in 1758, and refers to the examples flying in Europe. In their monograph on the Lycaenopsis group of polyommatine genera, Eliot & Kawazoe, 1983, list 14 taxa as valid subspecies names, plus many further synonyms to which they accord lesser status. According to Eliot & Kawazoe, 1983, these 14 subspecies are divided into four groups as follows:

The argiolus group
Palaearctic & North African

C. a. argiolus
C. a. bieneri
C. a. hypoleuca
=paraleuca Rober
C. a. mauretanica
=algirica Oberthur

The kollari group
South and South-East Asian

C. a. iynteana
=sikkima Moore
=victoria Swinhoe
=herophilus Fruhstorfer
=cition Fruhstorfer
=bothrinoides Chapman
=puspargiolus Chapman
=albocaeruloides Chapman
C. a. kollari
=kasmira Moore
=coelestina Kollar
=trita Swinhoe

The ladonides group
Far Eastern

C. a. caphis
=crimissa Fruhstorfer
C. a. ladonides
=levettii Butler
=sachalinensis Esaki
=heringi Kardakoff
C. a. sugurui

Common names
In India, C. argiolus is known as the hill hedge blue.

Range
Found in Eurasia. and South Asia, it occurs from Chitral in Pakistan to Kumaon in India.

See also
List of butterflies of India
List of butterflies of India (Lycaenidae)
List of butterflies of Great Britain

References

Eliot, J. N. and Kawazoe, A., 1983. Blue butterflies of the Lycaenopsis group: 1–309, 6 pls. London.

Willmott, Ken and Freed, Tim (1999). The Holly Blue Butterfly. Butterfly Conservation, Colchester, UK, 20p. .

External links

Celastrina
Butterflies of Asia
Butterflies of Europe
Butterflies of North America
Butterflies described in 1758
Taxa named by Carl Linnaeus
National symbols of Finland